Erik Malmberg (15 March 1897 – 9 May 1964) was a Swedish wrestler. He competed at the 1924, 1928 and 1932 Summer Olympics in Greco-Roman events and won a bronze, a silver, and a gold medal, respectively. His younger brother Algost also took part in the 1928 Games, but as a freestyle wrestler. Malmberg was a businessman by trade.

References

External links

 

1897 births
1964 deaths
Olympic bronze medalists for Sweden
Olympic gold medalists for Sweden
Olympic silver medalists for Sweden
Olympic wrestlers of Sweden
Wrestlers at the 1924 Summer Olympics
Wrestlers at the 1928 Summer Olympics
Wrestlers at the 1932 Summer Olympics
Swedish male sport wrestlers
Olympic medalists in wrestling
Medalists at the 1924 Summer Olympics
Medalists at the 1928 Summer Olympics
Medalists at the 1932 Summer Olympics
World Wrestling Championships medalists
European Wrestling Championships medalists
20th-century Swedish people